Alison Willow Yarrington FSA (born May 1951) is professor of the history of art at the University of Loughborough and a fellow of the Society of Antiquaries of London. She was formerly Richmond Professor of Fine Art at the University of Glasgow. She is chairperson of the editorial board of the Sculpture Journal.

Selected publications
 The Lustrous Trade: Material Culture and the History of Sculpture in England and Italy, c.1700-c.1860. Continnuum, 2000. (Editor with Cinzia Maria Sicca) 
 Travels and Translations: Anglo-Italian Cultural Transactions Rodopi, 2013. (Edited with Stefano Villani and Julia Kelly) 
 Reflections of Revolution: Images of Romanticism. Routledge, 2016. (Edited with Kelvin Everest)

References

External links 
https://www.researchgate.net/profile/Alison_Yarrington

Academics of Loughborough University
British art historians
Women art historians
British women academics
Alumni of the University of Reading
Alumni of Darwin College, Cambridge
Academics of the University of Leicester
Academics of the University of Glasgow
Fellows of the Society of Antiquaries of London
Fellows of the Royal Society of Edinburgh
1951 births
Living people